Cligenes is a genus of dirt-colored seed bugs in the family Rhyparochromidae. There are at least two described species in Cligenes.

Species
These two species belong to the genus Cligenes:
 Cligenes distinctus Distant, 1893
 Cligenes grandis Brambila, 2000

References

External links

Rhyparochromidae
Articles created by Qbugbot
Pentatomomorpha genera